Georgiy Karyukhin (born September 15, 1939) is a Soviet sprint canoeist who competed in the late 1960s. He won three medals at the 1966 ICF Canoe Sprint World Championships in East Berlin with a gold (K-1 4 x 500 m) and two bronzes (K-2 500 m, K-4 1000 m).

Karyuchin also competed in the K-4 1000 m event at the 1968 Summer Olympics in Mexico City, but was eliminated in the semifinals.

References

 

1939 births
Canoeists at the 1968 Summer Olympics
Living people
Olympic canoeists of the Soviet Union
Soviet male canoeists
Russian male canoeists
ICF Canoe Sprint World Championships medalists in kayak